was a Japanese samurai of the Edo period. A senior retainer of the Sendai domain, he was the sixth Katakura Kojūrō. His childhood name was Date Kiyonosuke (伊達喜世之助) later become Kojuro later changed to Sukesaburo (助三郎). His name later changed from Katakura Muranobu back to Date Murashige (伊達村茂).

Family
 Father: Date Muraoki (1683–1766)
 Mother: Mizawa Munenao's daughter
 Wife: Date Muramochi's daughter
 Children:
 Date Murayoshi (1745–1776)
 Date Murayori

External links
Katakura family tree (in Japanese)

Year of birth unknown
Year of death unknown
Samurai
Katakura clan